Mapo tofu is a popular Chinese dish from Sichuan province. It consists of tofu set in a spicy sauce, typically a thin, oily, and bright red suspension, based on douban (fermented broad bean and chili paste), and douchi (fermented black beans), along with minced meat, traditionally beef. Variations exist with other ingredients such as water chestnuts, onions, other vegetables, or wood ear fungus.  One account indicates that the dish existed as early as 1254, in a suburb of Chengdu, the capital city of Sichuan. Other accounts indicate it originated at a Chengdu restaurant in the 1860s.

Etymology and history
"Ma" stands for mázi, 麻子, which means pockmarks. "Po" is the first syllable of pópo, 婆婆, which means an old woman or grandma. Hence, mápó is an old woman whose face is pockmarked. It is thus sometimes translated as "pockmarked grandma's beancurd".

According to Mrs. Chiang's Szechwan Cookbook: "Eugene Wu, the Librarian of the Harvard Yenching Library, grew up in Chengdu and claims that as a schoolboy he used to eat Pock-Marked Ma's Bean Curd or mapo doufu, at a restaurant run by the original Pock-Marked Ma herself. One ordered by weight, specifying how many grams of bean curd and meat, and the serving would be weighed out and cooked as the diner watched. It arrived at the table fresh, fragrant, and so spicy hot, or la, that it actually caused sweat to break out."

In Japan, the dish was introduced and popularized by the Chinese-Japanese chef Chen Kenmin. His son, Chen Kenichi, made it more popular as it was one of his trademark dishes on the television program Iron Chef.

Characteristics
Authentic mapo tofu is powerfully spicy with both conventional "heat" spiciness and the characteristic málà (numbing spiciness) flavor of Sichuan cuisine. The feel of the particular dish is often described by cooks using seven specific Chinese adjectives: má 麻 (numbing), là 辣 (spicy hot), tàng 烫 (hot temperature), xiān 鲜 (fresh), nèn 嫩 (tender and soft), xiāng 香 (aromatic), and sū 酥 (flaky). The authentic form of the dish is increasingly easy to find outside China today, but it is usually adapted for non-Sichuanese tastes.

The most important and necessary ingredients in the dish that give it the distinctive flavour are chili broad bean paste (salty bean paste) from Sichuan's Pixian county (郫县豆瓣酱), fermented black beans, chili oil, chili flakes of the heaven-facing pepper (朝天辣椒), Sichuan peppercorns, garlic, ginger, green onions, and rice wine. Supplementary ingredients include water or stock, sugar (depending on the saltiness of the bean paste brand used), and starch (if it is desired to thicken the sauce).

Variations
Mapo tofu can also be found in restaurants in other Chinese provinces, as well as in Japan and Korea where the flavor is adapted to local tastes. In the West the dish is often greatly changed, with its spiciness toned down in order to widen its appeal. This happens particularly in Chinese restaurants which do not specialize in Sichuan cuisine. In American Chinese cuisine, the dish is sometimes made without meat to appeal to vegetarians, using shiitake, other edible mushrooms, or plant-based meat substitutes.

Gallery

See also

 Chinese cuisine
 Sichuan cuisine
 Kung Pao chicken
 List of Chinese dishes
 List of tofu dishes

References

External links 

Sichuan cuisine
Chinese cuisine
Hong Kong cuisine
Korean cuisine
Japanese cuisine
American Chinese cuisine
Tofu dishes